Alberto Jiménez-Becerril Barrio (August 21, 1960 in Seville – January 30, 1998 in Ibid) was a Spanish politician of the People's Party (PP) assassinated by the terrorist organization Euskadi Ta Askatasuna (ETA) in 1998.

Biography 
Alberto Jiménez-Becerril Barrio had a Law and History's Degree. He met his future wife Ascensión at the faculty, where they began their relationship.

He was appointed General Secretary of People's Party of Seville in 1983 and Seville’s Councillor since 1987. Alberto was also a deputy of the Parliament of Andalusia, between 1989 and 1990, and he had belonged to Sevilla Club of Fútbol’s Executive.

The separatist organization Euskadi Ta Askatasuna( ETA) assassinated Alberto Jiménez-Becerril Barrio and Ascensión García Ortiz in Seville on January 30, 1998. He was murdered at the age of 37. Ascension, Alberto's wife, worked at a law firm as a prosecutor in court. In the time that the murderer was committed, she was 39 years old and had three children; four years old, seven years old and eight years old as result of his marriage to Alberto.

Murder 
Alberto Jiménez-Becerril was councillor at the City Council of Seville for twelve years. He was elected through the lists of the People's Party, this party held the Mayor's Office with Soledad Becerril. He held the positions of Second Lieutenant of the Mayor and Municipal Delegate of the Treasury.

On January 30, 1998 Jiménez-Becerril and his wife, Ascension Garcia Ortiz, a procurator of the Courts of Seville, were killed by an ETA’s member on the street in the Old Town of Seville when they returned to their domicile around one in the morning. He was 37 years old and had three children between the ages of eight to four at the time of this death.

His murder caused a great consternation in the city and his funeral was attended by 45,000 people. The funeral was presided by Princess Elena.

Jimenez Becerril Foundation 
To perpetuate the memory of the victims, the City Council of Seville promoted the creation of the Anti-Terrorism and Violence Alberto Jiménez-Becerril Foundation which was constituted on December 1999. On March 11, 2014, European Day of the victims of Terrorism, the foundation placed a plaque against terrorism in the bedding of the Plaza of the Incarnation with the phrase of Gandhi, it says:  "There is no way for peace, peace is the way." In that same place, an olive tree was planted. On December 28, 2015, they placed another plaque in one of the flowerpots of a square at the crossroads of the street José Laguillo with Arroyo street. The plate has some verses about peace and freedom by the poet Enrique Barrero.

Other awards 
The extension of Torneo de Sevilla Street was named after him as Avenida Alberto Jiménez-Becerril. A perpendicular street to the one previously mentioned was named Procurator Ascension Garcia. A stone plaque in memory of the event was placed where the assassination occurred. At the main entrance of Columbus Hall at City Hall, there are two bronze busts of Alberto and Ascension. They also have a tile in their memory on San Jacinto de Triana street.

See also 

 (in Spanish) Anex:Asesinatos cometidos por ETA desde la muerte de Francisco Franco

General 

 This article makes use of material translated from the corresponding article in the Spanish-language Wikipedia.
 (in Spanish) Biography of Alberto Jiménez-Becerril Barrio in the Anti-Terrorism and Violence Alberto Jiménez-Becerril Foundation webpage

References 

People's Party (Spain) politicians
People killed by ETA (separatist group)
People from Seville
Assassinated Spanish politicians
1960 births
1998 deaths